Monasterio de San Martín de Salas is a monastery in Asturias, Spain.

Monasteries in Asturias
Bien de Interés Cultural landmarks in Asturias